Meadowvale GO Station is a GO Transit railway station on the Milton line in the Greater Toronto Area, Ontario, Canada. It is located at 6845 Millcreek Drive near Derry Road West and Winston Churchill Blvd., in the City of Mississauga in the community of Meadowvale.

As with most GO stations, Meadowvale offers parking for commuters, and ticket sales with an attendant during the morning rush hour. In addition to the trains, Meadowvale is served by train-buses outside the rush hours and in the reverse commute direction, by the Milton–– GO Bus route, by the Highway 407 express buses to Highway 407 Bus Terminal, and by Mississauga Transit buses.

Although ridership on the Milton line has grown beyond GO's expectations, the tracks are already busy with Canadian Pacific Railway freight traffic.  While it is possible to increase the number of trains, Canadian Pacific Railway will not allow it unless a third GO Transit dedicated right of way track is built. In order to increase capacity, GO Transit has extended the rail platform to accommodate trains with twelve carriages rather than the current ten. As a temporary solution, extensive train-bus services help alleviate congestion.

Connecting MiWay buses
44 Mississauga Road
64 Meadowvale GO
90 Terragar–Copenhagen
104 Derry Express

References

External links

GO Transit railway stations
Galt Subdivision
Railway stations in Mississauga
Railway stations in Canada opened in 1981
1981 establishments in Ontario